Lučina may refer to:

Lučina (river), a river in the Czech Republic
Lučina (Frýdek-Místek District), a municipality and village in the Czech Republic
Lučina (Ćićevac), a village in Serbia
Lučina, Jajce, a village in Bosnia and Herzegovina
Lučina, a village in the municipality of Slivno, Dubrovnik-Neretva County, Croatia